Limerick Chamber of Commerce also known as Limerick Chamber, was founded in 1805 Ireland. It is a business representative and lobbying organization that is in business for its 450+ members. The current President is Donnacha Hurley manager of the Absolute Hotel.

The Limerick Chamber was formally constituted by Charter on 2 June 1815, the Chamber was incorporated by a Royal Charter by King George III, under the title of ‘the Chamber of Commerce of Limerick'. In 1833, the Chamber moved to its present premises at 96 O'Connell Street. It is one of the five oldest chambers of commerce in Ireland and the UK at the time of its foundation. During the first half of the nineteenth century, the Chamber played a key role in the development of Limerick Harbour and also assumed control over pilotage in the River Shannon and made payments to individuals who salvaged vessels and marked hazards in the Estuary.

In 2015, Limerick Chamber published a book entitled ‘Limerick’s Merchants, Traders & Shakers – Celebrating two centuries of enterprise’ by Matthew Potter and Sharon Slater to mark its 200th Anniversary.

Past Presidents of Note 

 Francis Spaight (1847–60)
 James Spaight (1871–92)
 Alexander William Shaw (1899-1905)
 Thomas Cleeve (1908)
 Ted Russell (1948–50)
 Patrick Kennedy (1979–80)

References

External links 
 Official Website

Chambers of commerce
Limerick (city)
1805 establishments in Ireland